Leo Janos (1933–2008) was an American speechwriter and ghostwriter who was known for writing speeches for the President Lyndon Johnson. He authored and co-authored notable books including Skunk Works, Yeager: An Autobiography, and Crime of Passion.

In January 2008, he died at the age of 74 due to cancer.

Career
In 1965, he became an editor of Ameryka magazine.

In 1966, he was selected by President Johnson as his speechwriter, a post he worked on till 1968.

His book, Skunk Works, has been reviewed by Kirkus Reviews.

References 

1933 births
2008 deaths
Ghostwriters
American writers